Giovanni Maria Cerva was a 17th-century Italian painter of the Baroque period, active in quadratura in the city of Bologna. Also named il Bagnolino. He was a pupil of Menichino. He was active in 1640.

References

Quadratura painters
17th-century Italian painters
Italian male painters
Painters from Bologna
Italian Baroque painters